The Austin Glen Member of the Normanskill Formation is an upper Middle Ordovician unit of interbedded greywackes and shales that outcrops in eastern New York State.  It was deposited in a deep marine setting in a foreland basin during the Taconic orogeny.  Its sediment source was mainly the erosion of preexisting sedimentary rocks.  Graptolite fossils place it in the stratigraphic zones of Nematograptus gracilis and Climacograptus bicornis, but its age could be Llandeilo or Trentonian (earliest to latest Darriwilian).

References

Geology of New York (state)
Ordovician System of North America